Sylvia Gaye Stanfield (born 1943) is an American former diplomat who served in a variety of political and economic posts in the diplomatic corps before becoming the nation's first African-American woman Ambassador to Brunei (1999–2002).

Education 
Born in Texas, Stanfield graduated from James Madison High School in Dallas, where a science classroom was later named in honor of Stanfield and her twin sister, Eunice Stanfield. Stanfield earned a bachelor's degree (BA) in intercultural studies from Western College for Women in Oxford, Ohio. During college, she participated in study abroad programs that took her to Europe and the Middle East.

Career 
Stanfield began working for the U.S. State Department in 1968, going on to work in a variety of political and economic posts in the diplomatic corps in the former American embassy in Taipei, Taiwan (1969–71) and the American Institute in Taiwan (1985–87); the U.S. Consulate General in Hong Kong; and the U.S. Embassy in Beijing (1979–81) before becoming Chargé d'Affaires ad interim (1993–94), and Deputy Chief of Mission of the U.S. Embassy in Wellington, New Zealand (1993–95), which was her highest post prior to assuming the ambassadorship to Brunei (1999–2002).

After her ambassadorship ended, Stanfield became a Diplomat in Residence at Florida Agricultural & Mechanical University (2003–05); she went on to a second Diplomat in Residence post at Spelman College.

References 

1943 births
Living people
African-American diplomats
Ambassadors of the United States to Brunei
Ambassadors of the United States to New Zealand
Ambassadors of the United States to Samoa
American women ambassadors
Western College for Women alumni
People of the American Institute in Taiwan
United States Foreign Service personnel
People from Texas
University of Hawaiʻi alumni
21st-century African-American people
21st-century African-American women
20th-century American diplomats
21st-century American diplomats
20th-century African-American people
20th-century African-American women